The University of Sousse is a public university in Sousse, Tunisia.

History 
The University of Sousse was created in 2004 from a division of the University of the Center, which had been created in 1991 from the University of Monastir. The University of the Center had grown rapidly from 45,000 students in 2001-2002 to nearly 60,000 in 2003–2004 in 30 institutions. In 2004 new universities were created in Monastir, Kairouan and Gafsa.

Organisation and administration
The Rector is Professor Ahmed Nourreddine Helal.

Alumni
Samir Dilou, Minister of human rights, transitional justice and government spokesperson under Prime Minister Hamadi Jebali since 20 December 2011.

References

External links 
University website in English

 
2004 establishments in Tunisia
Universities in Tunisia
Educational institutions established in 2004